Caldwell Peak is a peak  north of Mount Terra Nova on Ross Island. At the suggestion of P.R. Kyle, it was named by the Advisory Committee on Antarctic Names (2000) after David A. Caldwell, geologist, New Mexico Institute of Mining and Technology, who worked two field seasons on Mount Erebus (first one, 1986–87); completed M.S. thesis on lava flows at the Mount Erebus summit.

References 

Mountains of Ross Island